"Be Right Here" is a song by French DJ Kungs and Norwegian production duo Stargate, featuring American vocalist Goldn. The song was released by record label Barclay, on 22 June 2018, through digital download and streaming formats. The song was written by Kungs, Camila Cabello, Charli XCX, Noonie Bao, Sasha Sloan, Stargate and Robert Bergin (also known as Throttle). "Be Right Here" was produced by Kungs, Stargate, Greg Cerrone, Kevin Calame, Tim Blacksmith, Danny D, Tyran "Ty Ty" Smith and Jay Brown.

The song received minor success on the French charts, peaking at 77.

Charts

References

External links
 

2018 songs
2018 singles
Kungs songs
Stargate (record producers) songs
Songs written by Mikkel Storleer Eriksen
Songs written by Tor Erik Hermansen
Songs written by Camila Cabello
Songs written by Charli XCX
Songs written by Noonie Bao
Songs written by Sasha Alex Sloan
Song recordings produced by Stargate (record producers)
Songs written by Kungs